Burrelton is a small village in Scotland about  outside Perth and  outside Dundee. It is joined onto another smaller village, Woodside. The population in 2001 was 621.

Education
The village is home to a small primary school called Burrelton Primary School. Pupils typically progress to one of the associated high schools, Perth Academy, or Blairgowie High School.

Transportation
 

Woodside and Burrelton railway station was opened by the Caledonian Railway, on the former Scottish Midland Junction Railway, running between Perth and Arbroath. It became part of the London, Midland and Scottish Railway during the Grouping of 1923. Passing on to the Scottish Region of British Railways on nationalisation in 1948, it was then closed by the British Transport Commission.

Notable residents
James Lamond, former Labour MP was born here in 1928
Bill Walker, former MP of the Conservative Party lived close to the village

References

External links

 ED.ac.uk

Villages in Perth and Kinross